Ibrahim Sadr (born Khodaidad), sometimes written Ibrahim Sadar, is a senior Taliban official serving as the acting deputy minister of interior affairs of Afghanistan since 21 September 2021. He previously served as the acting minister of interior affairs from 24 August 2021 to 7 September 2021.

Life and career 
Born Khodaidad, he changed his name to Ibrahim. Sadr was part of the Afghan mujahideen who fought against the Soviet forces in the Soviet–Afghan War. After the war, he moved to Peshawar in Pakistan to teach in a madrassa. Students there added Sadr (meaning 'president') to his name. During the first Taliban government, he was responsible for the Taliban's defence department managing Soviet aircraft. Holding stringent religious views, he developed close contacts with jihadist groups, including Al Qaeda.

After the US invasion, he returned to Peshawar. He was close to the original Taliban leader Mohammed Omar and Akhtar Mansour, who succeeded Omar, and Sadr rose in the Taliban hierarchy. Sadr was appointed the Taliban military chief commander in 2014. The Taliban did not announce his appointment publicly until August 2016.

Sadr's close friend Mansour, the Taliban leader, was killed in a US drone strike in Pakistan in 2016 and Sadr blamed Pakistan. Sadr refused to base himself in Pakistan or to attend Taliban meetings there, upsetting other members. He insisted on remaining in Afghanistan or Iran. Sadr used wealth from opium and marble smuggling to build his own support network within the Taliban, and he was also supported by Iran. Unhappiness with his independence within the Taliban, his dislike of Pakistan and his closeness to Iran led to him being replaced as the military chief by Mohammad Yaqoob in 2020, with Sadr becoming a deputy.

References

Living people
Taliban commanders
Taliban leaders
Year of birth missing (living people)